Initial D Arcade Stage 4 (イニシャルD アーケード ステージ 4) is a racing game developed by Sega. It is the sequel to Initial D Arcade Stage Ver.3. This version has been heavily updated compared to its predecessors. The game underwent location testing from October 21, 2006 to October 30, 2006 in game centers in Tokyo, Osaka, and Aomori, Japan, and was released on February 21, 2007. The international version was released in July 2007 which is named Initial D 4. This is the last installment of the series to be officially released in Western countries.

Unlike the older games in this series, which were revisions of the original title, Initial D Arcade Stage 4 has a completely new physics engine written for the Sega Lindbergh arcade system. This new system allows cars to actually slide, or drift, across the track when clearing corners; this is a feature which is not present in the older games. Initial D Arcade Stage 4 features animated cel-shaded characters interacting with each other, while the cars and environment use updated, high-definition graphics. The cabinet has a 32-inch 16:9 LCD screen supporting WXGA resolution (1366 x 768). The gear shift has been relocated to a lower more realistic location. The Japanese version of the game supports connection to Sega's All.Net online play network, allowing players from different arcades to play against each other.

The player cards for saving gameplay data have been changed to IC cards like other Lindbergh games such as Virtua Fighter 5, and Power Smash 3. The player can store data such as their vehicles, modifications to vehicles, avatar customizations and time attack times. Additionally, unlike the past three versions of the game, in which the player is limited to one car per card, the player can now store data for up to three different cars. Additionally, the IC Card can be used for 150 plays, as opposed to cards for past versions which can only be used for 50 plays. Players will not be able to transfer data from versions 1 through 3 due to the changes in both the player card and the card slot. The modification system has been updated as well, as car upgrades are no longer automatic, allowing players to choose which parts to upgrade and how to spend their reward points.

Car List

The following is a selectable car list according to the Official Initial D Arcade Stage 4 website.  Note that unlike previous versions of the game (which only added cars to expand its lineup), IDAS4 has removed cars which were deemed unpopular with players and/or non-canonical with the manga series.

Toyota
Trueno GT-APEX (AE86)
LEVIN GT-APEX (AE86)
LEVIN SR (AE85)
MR2 G-Limited (SW20)
Altezza RS-200 Z Edition (SXE10) (Replaced Altezza RS200)*
Mitsubishi Motors
Lancer Evolution III GSR (CE9A)
Lancer Evolution IV RS (CN9A)
Lancer Evolution IX GSR (CT9A) (Replaced Lancer Evolution VII GSR (CT9A))
Nissan
Skyline GTR V-Spec II (BNR32)
Skyline GTR V-Spec II Nur (BNR34) (Replaced Skyline GT-R V-Spec II (BNR34))
Silvia K's (S13)
Silvia Q's (S14)
Silvia Spec-R (S15)
180SX Type X (RPS13)
Sileighty (RPS13) (damaged 180sx with silvia s13 front end)
Mazda
RX-7 Type R (FD3S)
RX-7 Infiniti III (FC3S)
RX-8 Type S (SE3P)*
Eunos Roadster (NA6CE)* (replaced Roadster S-Special)
Honda
Honda Civic Type R (EK9)
Civic SiR II (EG6)
Integra Type R (DC2)
S2000 (AP1)
Subaru
Impreza WRX STi Version V Type R (GC8V)
Impreza WRX STi (GDBF) (Replaced Impreza WRX STi (GDB-A))
Suzuki
Suzuki Cappuccino (EA11R)

* Available since Version 1.50 (Initial D Arcade Stage 4 Kai - Japan only) and International Edition.

Courses
To chronicle with the Initial D manga, the stages have been tweaked as well. Some stages that are not featured in the new series are removed, with the others receiving tweaks and overhauls. As with the previous series, the race may be set in day / night as well as being dry or having rain.

Lake Akina (Easy) (NEW COURSE)
Lake Akina replaces the fake Myogi as the "beginner" course. Similar to the previous series, this is a course similar to a circuit such that the start and finish point are at the same location. This course's layout is changed later in Arcade Stage 5.

Myogi (Normal) (NEW COURSE)
Unlike the previous series, the new Myogi is more realistic, the full-length, point-to-point course seen in the manga & anime, and on Initial D Special Stage for PlayStation 2. It is a mountain road with a downhill and uphill direction similar to Akagi and Akina. Unlike the actual route, the game version is noticeably wider, possibly to reduce the difficulty.

 Mount Akagi (Hard)
Akagi is retained from the previous installments, with no changes to the course except the graphics.

 Akina (Hard)
Being the primary course, Akina is retained as well. However, the snow racing weather condition is removed.

 Irohazaka (Hard)
Being a one-way road, all races in Irohazaka are Downhill. However the uphill (reverse) route can be selected in time-attack mode and in-store battle mode.
—Irohazaka Reverse has been selectable since Initial D Arcade Stage Ver.3/Street Stage--

 Tsukuba (Expert) (NEW COURSE)
The Tsukuba touge is the final stage in the game. It is a long, narrow and windy mountain road that comprises both an uphill and downhill section with a lot of hairpin turns. To chronicle with the manga, this is the stage where the player will meet the toughest opponents including the "God Arm", "God Foot" and Project D.

 Special Match
After completing the Tsukuba stage, the player automatically starts a match with the legendary racer, Bunta Fujiwara. The stage is set in the Akina downhill, with a dry track and at night. Regardless of the result the game is considered "complete" after this stage, and Bunta will appear as Akina's final opponent during the succeeding playthroughs

Car modification
When playing with the IC card inserted, the game allows a degree of modification to the player's car. The car tuning and customization is done on the machine every three ejects of the card.

There are 4 customizing shops in game, each taking care of the following categories:
 Performance (Includes engine, transmission, airflow (intake and exhaust), suspension,  weight reduction and electronics)
 Bodywork (Includes wheels, rims, decals, mirrors and similar)
 Aerodynamic parts (Includes ground effect kits, hoods and spoilers)
 The player's avatar (accessible every 6 ejects).

The performance parts are sub-divided into 5 tabs, and each tab contains 7 parts that needs to be purchased in order. The bodywork and aerodynamic parts can be purchased in any order.

Except the player's avatar, all parts need money, which is calculated in points. Points can be awarded by playing the game and winning over the opponents.

Depending on the car model, special parts can be installed. Example of these include the race engine found on the Toyota AE86 and the misfiring system on the Evolution III.

The player's avatar is customized randomly, with the new parts selected with a reel similar to a slot machine.

Soundtrack

This song can be selected only in Initial D Arcade Stage 4 Kai (only Japan)

See also
 Initial D - anime & manga
 Initial D - 2005 Live-Action Movie
 Initial D Arcade Stage - Information on other games in the series
 Initial D Extreme Stage - The PlayStation 3 port of this game.

References

External links
 Official website (English)
 Official website (Japanese)

2007 video games
Arcade video games
Arcade-only video games
Initial D video games
Sega arcade games
Video games developed in Japan